Redcliffe may refer to:

Places

England
Redcliffe, Bristol, a district of the city
Redcliffe College, a Bible college in Gloucester, England

Queensland, Australia
Redcliffe Peninsula, a peninsula and suburban region in the Brisbane metropolitan area
Redcliffe Dolphins, a rugby league club
Redcliffe, Queensland, the central suburb of Redcliffe City
City of Redcliffe, the former Local Government covering Redcliffe
Electoral district of Redcliffe

Western Australia
Redcliffe, Western Australia

U.S.A.
 Redcliffe Plantation State Historic Site, listed on the NRHP in South Carolina

People
 John Redcliffe-Maud (1906–1982),  British civil servant and diplomat to South Africa, husband of Jean Redcliffe-Maud
 Jean Redcliffe-Maud (1904–1993), British pianist and author, wife of John Redcliffe-Maud
 Stratford Canning, 1st Viscount Stratford de Redcliffe (1786–1880), British diplomat, ambassador to the Ottoman Porte

See also
Redcliff (disambiguation)
Radcliffe (disambiguation)
Ratcliffe (disambiguation)